Ismantorp Fortress is the ruins of a ringfort located on Öland Island in Sweden.

Description
One of approximately 20 known ringforts located on Öland, Ismantorp was constructed during the Migration Period.
Ismantorp was never permanently occupied following its construction in about 200 CE, but used occasionally until abandoned around 650 CE. The ringfort consists of a limestone wall approximately 300 meters long and has nine gates. Inside the ringfort are 95 houses arranged in 12 blocks around a central open area with a circular building. Ismantorp is the largest and probably the oldest of the ringforts on Öland.

Gallery

See also
List of castles in Sweden

References

External links
Ismantorp Fortress
Aerial photograph from WikiMapia

Archaeological sites in Sweden
Castles in Kalmar County
Öland